Terry A. Moore (born June 30, 1965) is a Judge of the Alabama Court of Civil Appeals.

Education

Moore was born June 30, 1965 in Mobile, Alabama. He received his Bachelor of Arts from the University of South Alabama in 1990, and his Juris Doctor from the University of Alabama School of Law, graduating magna cum laude in 1993.

Legal career
After law school, Moore practiced law in Mobile, Alabama, with the firm of Adams & Reese where he specialized in workers' compensation and civil litigation. In 1998, he became a partner in the Mobile law firm of Vickers, Riis, Murray & Curran, LLC. Moore co-founded the firm Austill, Lewis, Pipkin & Moore, P.C. in 2004. He left private practice in 2006 when he was elected to the Alabama Court of Civil Appeals.

In 1998, he published a two-volume text called "Alabama Workers' Compensation" that covers the law and many court decisions about it. Moore said his book has been cited in decisions released by the Court of Civil Appeals and the state Supreme Court.

Service on Alabama Court of Civil Appeals
On December 22, 2005 Moore announced that he would run in the Republican primary June 6 for the seat then held by Republican Judge John Crawley, who retired. He was elected to the position in November 2006, and his current term expires on January 13, 2019.

Personal life
Moore is a registered Republican.

References

Living people
1965 births
Politicians from Mobile, Alabama
Alabama Republicans
Alabama state court judges
Alabama lawyers
University of South Alabama alumni
Cumberland School of Law alumni
21st-century American judges
Lawyers from Mobile, Alabama